Lochaber Mines  is a rural community on the Eastern Shore of Nova Scotia, Canada, in the Halifax Regional Municipality. The community is located along East River and is near the Marshall Flowage, a large lake at the head of East River. The community is named for Lochaber, located in Scotland. In 1812, Alexander Fraser received a grant of land in the area. Several gold leads were opened by J.H. Anderson in 1887 in the area, however, not much work was done outside of exploratory work.

References
Citations

Bibliography

Communities in Halifax, Nova Scotia